Hadsar fort is among the many forts in Junnar region of Pune district which were meant for protection of the ancient commercial trade route from Mawal region to Kalyan via Naneghat. There is a marvelous sculpture design of the bastion and the fort entrance, which is not seen elsewhere. They are all carved from a single rock.

History
It is believed that this fort was built in the Satavahana Era. This fort was mentioned in the Treaty of Purandar between King Shivaji and Moghuls. This fort was captured by British in 1818.

Places to see
The uniqueness of this fort is in the construction of the entrance gate. The entrance gate, rooms for sentries, water cisterns, steps to the fort are all chiselled from single rock. There is temple of Mahdev at the top of the fort. There are stone cut idols of Ganesh, Garud and Hanuman in the temple. There is a big lake on the fort.

How to reach
The Hadsar fort is near the Village Hadsar. Hadsar village is located 13  km North-West of Junnar. From the village, there are two paths to reach the fort top. The easiest way is from the southern side, which passes through the main gate. the other way is from the northern side of the Fort. There is a rock path of 20feet high to climb. There are rock-cut holds and thrust to rely upon, but is a very difficult yet thrilling experience. The help of experts with climbing apparatus and ropes should be taken while climbing. A night halt can be made in the Mahadev village. The route to the village Hadsar is shared in the link.

Gallery

References

See also 
 Junnar
 List of forts in Maharashtra
 Naneghat

Forts in Pune district